Gate Lodge is a small house located at Mount Austin Road on Victoria Peak, Hong Kong Island, Hong Kong. Gate Lodge was built between 1900 and 1902. It is in Renaissance style. 

It was a part of the former complex known as Mountain Lodge, home to the then Governor of Hong Kong. However, the main building was demolished in 1946. The Gate Lodge remains, but no longer used as an official residence.

The Gate Lodge originally served as living quarters for the keeper of Mountain Lodge. It was declared as a monument in 1995 and it is now preserved in Victoria Peak Garden and used as a site office of the Leisure and Cultural Services Department.

Future development
To put the building to meaningful use and leverage its historical legacy, Senior Government Architect Raymond Fung said it will be used as a public gallery. 

"What we are going to do is to open this gate door, so that you can enter this  space inside where we will put pictures and descriptions about the history of Victoria City and also Hong Kong in general, therefore giving information of our history to visitors."

References

External links
 
Antiquities and Monuments Office: Gate Lodge of the former Mountain Lodge 

Declared monuments of Hong Kong
Government buildings in Hong Kong
Houses completed in 1902
Landmarks in Hong Kong
Official residences in Hong Kong
Victoria Peak

pt:Mountain Lodge#O Gate Lodge